The 1903 Norwegian Football Cup was the second season of the Norwegian annual knockout football tournament. This was an invitation tournament organised by defending cup winner, Grane, which was later given official status. Four teams joined this competition. Odd won their first title.

Semi-finals

|colspan="3" style="background-color:#97DEFF"|21 September 1903

|-
|colspan="3" style="background-color:#97DEFF"|22 September 1903

|}

Final

{| width=100%
|valign=top width=50%|

References

External links
RSSSF Football Archive

Norwegian Football Cup seasons
Nor
Cup